There is and over lap between the Combat sports of Boxing and Mixed martial arts fighters with professional records in both are listed below.

A 

  Ben Askren 0–1

B 
  Ali Bagautinov 2–0
  Vitor Belfort 1–0
  Randy Blake 2–1
  Arlene Blencowe 4–4
  Antwain Britt 1–0
  T.J. Brown 1–0
  Mikey Burnett 1–0
  Raphael Butler 35–12–0

C 
  Donald Cerrone 0–1
  Jason Chambers 0–1
  LaVerne Clark 14–18–1
  Rich Clementi 0–1
  Clay Collard 9–2–3
  Carlos Condit 0–1
  Kit Cope 1–1
  Patrick Cote 0–1
  Rashad Coulter 1–0
  Jeff Curran 2–2–1

D 
  Mac Danzig 0–1
  Marcus Davis 17–1–2
  Nick Diaz 1–0
  Joe Duffy 7–0

E 
  Marvin Eastman 1–0
  Yves Edwards 2–0
  Aleksander Emelianenko 1–1–1
  Eric "Butterbean" Esch 77–7–4
  Andre Ewell 0–4

F 
  Ryan Ford 16–4
  Julius Francis 23–24–1
  Don Frye 2–5–1

G 
  Leonard Garcia 0–1
  Peter Graham 11–4–1
  Melvin Guillard 0–1–1

H 
  Uriah Hall 1-0
  Chevelle Hallback 27–5–2
  Dennis Hallman 1–3
  Heather Hardy 22–1–1
  Clint Hester 3–3–1
  Marcus Hicks 5–4–1
  Holly Holm 33–2–3
  Mark Hunt 1–2–1

I 
  Zelim Imadaev 0–1

J 
  Dustin Jacoby 1–0–0
  Keith Jardine 3–0–1
  Qiu Jianliang 1–0
  Art Jimmerson 33–18–0
  Dashon Johnson 22–23–3

K 
  Sergei Kharitonov 2–0
  Justine Kish 1–0
  Ava Knight 19–2–5 
  Jörgen Kruth 1–0–0
  Mike Kyle 1–3–1

L 
  Taylor Lapilus 1–0
  Jenel Lausa 10–0–1
  Jerome Le Banner 6–0–0
  Kathy Long 2–1
  Chris Lytle 13–1–1

M 
  Jennifer Maia 3–0
  Fábio Maldonado 27–5
  Terry Martin 5–1–0
  Jorge Masvidal 1–0–0
  Ricardo Mayorga 32–12–1
  Court McGee 2–1–0
  Conor McGregor 0–1
  Tim Means 2–1
  Ray Mercer 36–7–1
  Guy Mezger 1–0–0
  Mighty Mo 2–1–0
  Pat Miletich 1–0–0
  Frank Mir 0–1
  Jeff Monson 2–1–1
  John Moraga 1–3

N 
  Josh Neer 1–0
  Journey Newson 0–1–1
  Alex Nicholson 1–1
  Yōsuke Nishijima 24–2–1
  K. J. Noons 11–2–0
  Jan Nortje 11–0–0

Q 
  Billy Quarantillo 1–0

P 
  Michael Page 2–0
  Dustin Pague 1–0
  John Wayne Parr 11–3
  Ross Pearson 1–0
  Luis Peña 0–2–1
  Alex Pereira 1–0
  Costas Philippou 3–0–0

R 
  Jessica Rakoczy 33–3
  Elena Reid 19–6–6
  Nick Ring 5–1
  Angela Rivera-Parr 2–3
  Ricco Rodriguez 1–1–0
  Rick Roufus 13–5–1

S 
  Alessio Sakara 8–1
  Darrill Schoonover 1–0–0
  Ray Sefo 5–1–0
  Amanda Serrano 40–1–1
  Eric Shelton 1–0
  Anderson Silva 3–2–0
  Antônio Silva 0-1
  Assuerio Silva 1–0
  Matt Skelton 25–6–0
  Kimbo Slice 7–0
  Maurice Smith 0–2–0
  Patrick Smith 5–10–2
  Roberto Soldić 4–0
  Tyrone Spong 14–0
  Valentina Shevchenko 2–0
  Andreas Spång 0–0–1
  Mia St. John 46–11–2
  Cody Stamann 0–1

T 
  Din Thomas 1–0–1
  James Toney 77–10–3
  Erin Toughill 7–4–1 1NC

U 
  Alexander Ustinov 36–5-0

V 
  Rico Verhoeven 1–0
  James Vick 2–2
  Alexander Volkanovski 1–0

W 
  James Warring 18–4–1
  Carter Williams 2–0–0
  Jeremy Williams 43–5–1
  Rubin Williams 29–14–1
  Tyron Woodley 0-2

See also
List of female boxers
List of male boxers
List of female mixed martial artists
List of male mixed martial artists
List of prizefighters with professional boxing and kickboxing records

References

Mixed martial artists
Boxing
Mixed martial artists, boxing